Alexandre Afonso da Silva (born 15 August 1983), known as Alex da Silva or simply Alex, is a Brazilian footballer who plays as an attacking midfielder for Belgian side Kabouters Opglabbeek.

Career 
He signed a 3-year contract with Marília in July 2005, but on loan to Santos until the end of 2005 season. In July 2006, he joined K.R.C. Genk but his contract was disbanded in July 2009 and than on 22 July 2009 K. Sint-Truidense V.V. signed the Brazilian midfielder on a free transfer until June 2010. In August 2010 the Brazilian midfielder joined Enosis Neon Paralimni. In May 2011, he transferred to Omonia for a fee of €150,000. In January 2012, he moved to AEK Larnaca.

External links

Brazilian FA archive 
krcgenk.be 

1983 births
Living people
Brazilian footballers
Brazilian expatriate footballers
Marília Atlético Clube players
Santos FC players
K.R.C. Genk players
Sint-Truidense V.V. players
R.W.D.M. Brussels F.C. players
Enosis Neon Paralimni FC players
AC Omonia players
AEK Larnaca FC players
Apollon Limassol FC players
AEL Limassol players
Belgian Pro League players
Challenger Pro League players
Cypriot First Division players
Ukrainian Premier League players
Association football midfielders
Expatriate footballers in Belgium
Expatriate footballers in Cyprus
Sportspeople from Minas Gerais